Ivan Harris Riley (December 31, 1900 – October 28, 1943) was an American athlete who competed mainly in the 400 metre hurdles. He competed for the United States in the 1924 Summer Olympics held in Paris, France in the 400 metre hurdles where he won the bronze medal.

References

External links
 

People from Newton, Kansas
Track and field athletes from Kansas
American male hurdlers
Olympic bronze medalists for the United States in track and field
Athletes (track and field) at the 1924 Summer Olympics
1900 births
1943 deaths
Medalists at the 1924 Summer Olympics
Deaths from brain cancer in the United States
Deaths from cancer in Kansas